Mitromorpha insolens is a species of sea snail, a marine gastropod mollusk in the family Mitromorphidae.

Description
The length of the shell attains 2.9 mm, its diameter 1.3 mm.

The very small shell has a pale and clear straw color throughout. The about fifteen ribs are separated by fully their own widths. They are much more nearly obliterated between the strong spirals than the latter are between the ribs.

Distribution
This species occurs in the Atlantic Ocean off St. Helena.

References

External links
 

insolens
Gastropods described in 1904